The French ironclad Richelieu was a wooden-hulled central battery ironclad built for the French Navy in the early 1870s. She was named after the 17th century statesman Cardinal de Richelieu. The ship was the flagship of the Mediterranean Squadron for most of her career. Richelieu caught on fire in Toulon in 1880 and was scuttled to prevent her magazines from exploding. She was salvaged and, after being repaired, resumed her role as flagship. In 1886, however, the ship was placed in reserve and was eventually condemned in 1901. While being towed to the ship breakers in Amsterdam in 1911, Richelieu was caught in a storm in the Bay of Biscay and had to be cast loose from her tugboat. Nevertheless, the ship survived the storm and was recovered near the Scilly Isles from where she was towed to her final destination.

Design and description
Richelieu was designed by Henri Dupuy de Lôme as an improved version of the s. As a central battery ironclad she had her armament concentrated amidships. Like most ironclads of her era she was equipped with a plough-shaped ram that projected  from her hull. Her crew numbered around 750 officers and men. The metacentric height of the ship was very low, a little above .

Propulsion
Richelieu was given two propellers by Henri Dupuy de Lôme to make her more maneuverable for ramming. She had two Indret 3-cylinder horizontal return connecting rod compound steam engines, each driving a single propeller. Her engines were powered by eight oval boilers. On sea trials the engines produced  and Richelieu reached . Richelieu was initially square rigged with three masts, then cut down to a schooner rig.

Armament
Richelieus intermediate armament of four  guns was mounted in barbettes on the upper deck, one gun at each corner of the battery, with her six  guns on the battery deck below the barbettes. One 240-millimeter gun was mounted in the forecastle as a chase gun. The ship's secondary armament consisted of ten  guns. These were later replaced by six  guns.

The guns could fire both solid shot and explosive shells.

At some point the ship received eight, and then later ten more,  Hotchkiss 5-barrel revolving guns. They had a rate of fire of about 30 rounds per minute. The hull was not recessed to enable any of the guns on the battery deck to fire forward or aft. However, the guns mounted in the barbettes sponsoned out over the sides of the hull did have some ability to fire fore and aft. Late in the ship's career four above-water  torpedo tubes were added.

Armor
Richelieu had a complete  wrought iron waterline belt.

Service
Richelieu was laid down at Toulon in 1869 and launched on 3 December 1873. While the exact reason for such prolonged construction time is not known, it was probably due to financial pressures caused by slashing of French Navy's budget which was cut after the Franco-Prussian War of 1870–71 coupled with the outdated work practices of the French dockyards at the time, which were not suitable for the Industrial Age. The ship began her sea trials on 12 April 1875, but did not begin her service with the Mediterranean Squadron, of which she became flagship, until 10 February 1876. She was placed in reserve on 3 December 1879.

While in Toulon harbor on 29 December 1880, Richelieu caught fire and had to be scuttled to prevent her magazines from exploding. In order to salvage her, all accessible guns, ammunition, masts, armor and movable decks were removed and the equivalent weight was placed in the ship's holds to lower her center of gravity. After an hour and a half of lifting, Richelieu had been righted to a 45° angle; a subsequent effort completed the job.

Richelieu was repaired and returned to service as the flagship of the Mediterranean Squadron on 8 October 1881 where she remained until 1886. The squadron made port visits in Tangiers and Lisbon in 1884 before sailing to Brest and Cherbourg for exercises. The ship was placed back in reserve in 1886 and became flagship of the Reserve Squadron on 8 September 1892, which, despite its name, consisted of ships in commission. The squadron conducted exercises from June to August 1892 in French waters. Richelieu was condemned on 5 March 1900, but was not immediately sold. After having been sold to Dutch ship breakers, Richelieu departed Toulon on 28 January 1911. She was under tow in the Bay of Biscay, having left the Mediterranean for the first time in her existence, when a storm caused the tugboat to cast her loose. The ship remained afloat, however, and was subsequently recovered near the Scilly Isles, or drifted on to rocks in the Scilly Isles, and towed to Amsterdam where she was broken up.

See also
List of large sailing vessels

Footnotes

References

 
 
 

 
 

1873 ships
Ships built in France
Maritime incidents in December 1880
Ship fires
Shipwrecks of France
Scuttled vessels
Ironclad warships of the French Navy